Following are lists of members of the New South Wales Legislative Assembly:

 1856–1858
 1858–1859
 1859–1860
 1860–1864
 1864–1869
 1869–1872
 1872–1874
 1874–1877
 1877–1880
 1880–1882
 1882–1885
 1885–1887
 1887–1889
 1889–1891
 1891–1894
 1894–1895
 1895–1898
 1898–1901
 1901–1904
 1904–1907
 1907–1910
 1910–1913
 1913–1917
 1917–1920
 1920–1922
 1922–1925
 1925–1927
 1927–1930

 1930–1932
 1932–1935
 1935–1938
 1938–1941
 1941–1944
 1944–1947
 1947–1950
 1950–1953
 1953–1956
 1956–1959
 1959–1962
 1962–1965
 1965–1968
 1968–1971
 1971–1973
 1973–1976
 1976–1978
 1978–1981
 1981–1984
 1984–1988
 1988–1981
 1991–1995
 1995–1999
 1999–2003
 2003–2007
 2007–2011
 2011–2015
 2015–2019
 2019-2023